Carnamah is a town in the Mid West region of Western Australia, about  north of Perth along the Midlands Road. According to 2021 census, the population of the town is 407.

The town was gazetted in 1913, and is named after "Carnamah", the name of a pastoral property established by Duncan Macpherson in this location in the late 1860s. A telegraph station was established here in 1873, and is referred to in 1876 by the explorer Ernest Giles. Giles spells it "Cornamah" in his book, but "Carnamah" on his map. Macpherson's property "Carnamah" derives its name from Carnamah Spring. The name is probably Aboriginal of unknown meaning, or possibly is a Gaelic word meaning "cairn of the cattle" or "cattle rocks".

The Midland Railway line was constructed through the area in 1894, and a siding was built close to the Macpherson's homestead. This in turn led to further settlement of the area. 
The Carnamah Progress Association was formed in 1912, and the Carnamah State School was established, and in 1913 the townsite was declared.

In 1932 the Wheat Pool of Western Australia announced that the town would have two grain elevators, each fitted with an engine, installed at the railway siding.

The main industry in town is wheat farming, with the town being a Cooperative Bulk Handling receival site.

See also
 Carnamah Historical Society

References

External links

Shire of Carnamah
Carnamah Historical Society
Early History of Carnamah
Virtual Museum: to be known and distinguished as Carnamah
Winchester Cemetery, Carnamah
Biographical Dictionary of Coorow, Carnamah and Three Springs

Towns in Western Australia
Mid West (Western Australia)
Grain receival points of Western Australia